Patrick James John Eddery  (18 March 1952 – 10 November 2015) was an Irish flat racing jockey and trainer. He rode three winners of the Derby and was Champion Jockey on eleven occasions. He rode the winners of 4,632 British flat races, a figure exceeded only by Sir Gordon Richards.

Background

Eddery was born in Newbridge, County Kildare, less than 2 miles from the Curragh Racecourse, and his birth was registered in Dublin. He was the fifth child of Jimmy Eddery, a jockey who rode Panaslipper to win the Irish Derby in 1955, and Josephine (the daughter of jockey Jack Moylan). His brother, Paul, also went on to become a jockey. He attended the Patrician Brothers' Primary School in Newbridge and when the family later moved to Blackrock, the Oatlands Primary School in Stillorgan.

Riding career
Since early childhood, Pat Eddery's most frequent dreams were to be the champion jockey and winning the Derby.

Eddery began his career as an apprentice jockey in Ireland with the stable of Seamus McGrath. In 1967 he moved to England where he was apprenticed to Frenchie Nicholson and recorded his first success on Alvaro at Epsom Downs Racecourse on 24 April 1969 after riding more than one whole season without a single winner. The same horse was to give Eddery 6 wins in succession during the 1969 season. While still riding as an apprentice he won the Wokingham Handicap and the Timeform Gold Cup in 1969, the Northumberland Plate in 1970 and the Goodwood Stakes in 1971, a year in which he won the title of Champion Apprentice Jockey. Before formally out of apprenticeship, Eddery won the Ascot Gold Cup in 1972 after the disqualification of Roc Roi. Nicknamed Polyfilla in his early career, Pat was described as a seal in water on horseback in for a long swim.

Throughout his riding career he clinched 11 championship titles, two batches coming in four consecutive seasons (1974–1977; 1988–1991).  But for his joining the Vincent O'Brien stable in autumn 1980 that took him out of all main Saturday meetings in England, he would certainly have recorded more champion titles, though he did become the Irish Champion in 1982.  His last champion title in 1996 was his determination to regain what he had lost when the English racing season switched over in the early 1990s to multi-purpose track racing starting in November, a time when Eddery was customarily riding for other overseas retainers since the early 1970s.

Eddery's first championship title in 1974 saw the youngest English flat racing champion emerging after World War II, a record not since broken by subsequent champions. He was also first voted the Jockey of the Year in 1974 by the Horserace Writers' Association. He finished his retainer with Peter Walwyn in 1980 after two seasons of equine virus acutely affecting the Walwyn stables.  He then joined forces with the greatest racing conglomerate of that time – the Ballydoyle stables under Irish compatriot Vincent O'Brien. When in the mid-1980s the Arab owners began to dominate the British racing scene, Eddery was retained globally  by the owner of Juddmonte stables, Arab prince Khalid Abdullah, a position he held until 1994, after which he rode as freelance jockey until his retirement from the saddle at the end of 2003.

Eddery's riding style was not elegant by normal standards, owing to his habit of bouncing up and down in the saddle as he urged his mounts on at the final finishes, but was undeniably effective. Frenchie Nicholson said that he regretted the fact that his protegee abandoned the "quiet, refined" style he had been taught but admitted that the young jockey stood out as being "in total harmony" with the horses he rode.

Eddery rode for the Newmarket trainer Geoffrey Barling in 1972 before taking over as the stable jockey for Peter Walwyn later that year. For Walwyn he won his first two classic races on Polygamy and Grundy and was Champion Jockey in four consecutive seasons from 1974 to 1977. While under retainer with Walwyn, he clinched his first title at the record young age of 22. In 1975 he rode Grundy to victory over Bustino for the King George VI and Queen Elizabeth Diamond Stakes at Ascot Racecourse in what became known as Britain's "Race of the Century". Well known for riding champion horses like Sadler's Wells, Danehill (the grand sires on the sire and dam side of Frankel), etc., Eddery was also famed for riding for big owners as well as champion trainers. Apart from the later illustrious associations with Robert Sangster, Arab giant owners Prince Khalid bin Abdullah, Wafic Saïd and Maktoum al-Maktoum, he rode to winners in the then Colony of Hong Kong on the first ever race horse to be owned by tycoon Li Ka Shing, called 'Golden Victory' and trained by English trainer John Brown to whom Eddery rode for many seasons in winter in Hong Kong since 10 November 1973.

In the following decade, Eddery became associated with the Irish Ballydoyle stable of Vincent O'Brien and gained further classic success on Kings Lake, Lomond, Golden Fleece, Assert and El Gran Senor. In 1986, on the choice of the horse's owner, he took over from Greville Starkey as the rider of Dancing Brave. He partnered Dancing Brave to victory in the King George VI and Queen Elizabeth Stakes and the Prix de l'Arc de Triomphe and became the worldwide retained jockey of the colt's owner, Khalid Abdullah. While the press played up in the course of years the controversy between Starkey and Eddery, Eddery had been most reticent and underplayed the apparent falling out. Major winners in the Abdullah colours included Zafonic, Quest for Fame, Warning and Toulon. He was Champion Jockey a further seven times in eleven years between 1986 and 1996. His epic battle for championship in 1987 with American Steve Cauthen was particularly intense, with Cauthen winning the title with 197 and Eddery coming close at 195, and but for an objection from the third horse after the last definitive race in which Eddery won against Cauthen making the Championship a tie, the title would have been a shared one. In the year 1988, Eddery completed 183 winners from 480 odd rides – which was a great strike rate, and regained the title.

Eddery also rode several major winners outside Europe including Jupiter Island in the 1986 Japan Cup and Pebbles in the 1985 Breeders' Cup Turf In North America he also won the Arlington Million on Tolomeo, the Canadian International Stakes on French Glory and the Breeders' Cup Sprint on Sheikh Albadou. An active racing ambassador overseas since his early years, Eddery joined forces with Lester Piggott, Joe Mercer and French champion Freddie Head and Yves Saint-Martin in a group of riders to take part in a series of challenge races under the 'Ritz Club Challenge Trophy' at Singapore and other Asian cities starting in 1983 for several years. Eddery's overseas winners, tallying with his British winners, exceeded well over 6,000.

In 1990 he was the winner of the inaugural Lester Award for Flat Jockey of the Year, which he again won in 1991 and 1996, sharing on the latter occasion with Frankie Dettori. He also received two Flat Jockey Special Recognition awards in 2002 and 2003. He retired from the saddle at the end of the 2003 flat season and stated that he had no intention of becoming a trainer.

For the most part of his ultra-successful riding career, and spanning a quarter of a century, Pat Eddery's booking agent was his brother-in-law Terry Ellis, from the time Eddery was under retainer with Peter Walwyn until 1999 when he was riding as freelance. They parted ways after Eddery underwent a slipped-disc operation in 1999, with Ellis helping out the other riding members of the Eddery family.

Eddery summed up his attitude to the sport by saying, "That's all part of the game, going to the Folkestones and the smaller tracks, because it's not Royal Ascot every day. You've got to be out there every day working those muscles, riding in every race if you want to be at your best. There may be more money for a Derby than a seller but that doesn't make you try any harder. A winner is a winner." In his autobiography, he admitted that his primary and sole motive as jockey was to ride winners, and any one saying that he does not wish to win is either a liar or a fool

Training career
Despite his earlier statements and on the suggestion of wife Carolyn, in July 2005, Eddery was granted a training licence and set up a stable of 40 horses at Musk Hill Stud in Nether Winchendon, near Aylesbury. His brother, Paul Eddery, was Assistant Trainer and his Racing Manager was Simon Double who also co-founded Pat Eddery Racing, the racehorse syndication company which provided the opportunity for people to own shares in racehorses.

Eddery's first runner as a trainer was Perez, who finished second in an all-weather maiden race at Wolverhampton in December 2005. His first training success was with the horse Visionist in a handicap race at Kempton Park in April 2006. His first winner on turf was the two-year-old filly Cavort in a maiden 6 furlong race at Goodwood. His trainer career culminated with Hearts Of Fire winning Italy's Group 1 Gran Criterium in 2009. He sent out his final runner in the week before his death.

In 2005, he was awarded an honorary OBE, which he described as "a great honour".

In 2012, he acted as a judge in the Godolphin Stud and Stable Staff Awards, giving up his free time generously in support of the industry he was so successful in.

Family
One of the twelve living children of Jimmy Eddery and Josephine Moylan, the other four of the five male siblings of Pat Eddery are horse-riders in one way or the other: Michael, Robert, Paul and David. His uncle Robert Moylan also rode successfully. 
Pat Eddery married in November 1978 Carolyn, the daughter of flat jockey Manny Mercer, niece of jockey Joe Mercer, and granddaughter of jockey Harry Wragg. They had two daughters, Nichola and Natasha, and a son Harry. Eddery had another son, Toby Atkinson, who also became a jockey. The marriage broke down in 2008 and the couple formally divorced in 2009.

Death
Eddery died on 10 November 2015, aged 63 at Stoke Mandeville Hospital due to a heart attack, but suffered a long battle with alcoholism. His funeral was held on 8 December 2015 and he was cremated at Oxford after the funeral, with his ashes to be scattered on his family compound according to his last wishes.

Publications and biography
Pat on the Back, written by Claude Duval, published in 1976 by Stanley Paul, London
To be a Champion, autobiography by Pat Eddery and Alan Lee, published in 1992 by Coronet Books

Major wins as a jockey

 Great Britain
 1,000 Guineas – (1) – Bosra Sham (1996)
 2,000 Guineas – (3) – Lomond (1983), El Gran Senor (1984), Zafonic (1993)
 Ascot Gold Cup – (2) – Erimo Hawk (1972), Celeric (1997)
 Champion Stakes – (3) – Vitiges (1976), Pebbles (1985), Bosra Sham (1996)
 Cheveley Park Stakes – (5) – Pasty (1975), Woodstream (1981), Prophecy (1993), Gay Gallanta (1994), Wannabe Grand (1998)
 Coronation Cup – (6) – Crow (1978), Rainbow Quest (1985), Saint Estephe (1986), Saddler's Hall (1992), Sunshack (1995), Silver Patriarch (1998)
 Coronation Stakes – (2) – Orchestration (1977), Magic of Life (1988)
 Derby – (3) – Grundy (1975), Golden Fleece (1982), Quest for Fame (1990)
 Dewhurst Stakes – (6) – Lunchtime (1972), Grundy (1974), Storm Bird (1980), El Gran Senor (1983), Zafonic (1992), Grand Lodge (1993)
 Eclipse Stakes – (3) – Coup de Feu (1974), Solford (1983), Sadler's Wells (1984)
 Falmouth Stakes – (3) – Star Pastures (1981), Magic Gleam (1989), Ryafan (1997)
 Fillies' Mile – (2) – Tessla (1988), Bosra Sham (1995)
 Golden Jubilee Stakes – (1) – Great Commotion (then called The Cork and Orrery Stakes 1990)
 Haydock Sprint Cup – (3) – Record Token (1976), Dowsing (1988), Danehill (1989)
 International Stakes – (4) – Beldale Flutter (1981), Assert (1982), Caerleon (1983), One So Wonderful (1998)
 July Cup – (2) – Sharpo (1982), Lake Coniston (1995)
 King George VI and Queen Elizabeth Stakes – (2) – Grundy (1975), Dancing Brave (1986)
 King's Stand Stakes – (1) – African Song (1980)
 Middle Park Stakes – (5) – Habat (1973), Formidable (1977), Bassenthwaite (1984), Primo Valentino (1999), Balmont (2003)
 Nassau Stakes – (3) – Dancing Rocks (1982), Free Guest (1985), Ela Romara (1988)
 Nunthorpe Stakes – (4) – Sharpo (1980, 1981), Cadeaux Genereux (1989), Sheikh Albadou (1991)
 Oaks – (3) – Polygamy (1974), Scintillate (1979), Lady Carla (1996)
 Prince of Wales's Stakes – (5) – Record Run (1975), English Spring (1986), Two Timing (1989), Batshoof (1990), Placerville (1993)
 Queen Anne Stakes – (3) – Valiyar (1983), Pennine Walk (1986), Warning (1989)
 Queen Elizabeth II Stakes – (3) – Milligram (1987), Warning (1988), Bigstone (1993)
 Racing Post Trophy – (5) – Sporting Yankee (1976), Dactylographer (1977), Beldale Flutter (1980), Reference Point (1986), Armiger (1992)
 St. James's Palace Stakes – (3) – Radetzky (1976), Posse (1980), Persian Heights (1988)
 St. Leger – (4) – Moon Madness (1986), Toulon (1991), Moonax (1994), Silver Patriarch (1997)
 Sun Chariot Stakes – (2) – Sweet Farewell (1974), Free Guest (1985)
 Sussex Stakes – (6) – Posse (1980), Kings Lake (1981), Warning (1988), Marling (1992), Distant View (1994), Reel Buddy (2003)
 Yorkshire Oaks – (3) – May Hill (1975), Busaca (1977), Ramruma (1999)

 Canada
 Canadian International Stakes – (1) – French Glory (1990)

 France
 Critérium de Saint-Cloud – (1) – Miserden (1988)
 Grand Prix de Saint-Cloud – (2) – Glint of Gold (1982), Moon Madness (1987)
 Poule d'Essai des Pouliches – (2) – Ukraine Girl (1981), Houseproud (1990)
 Prix de l'Abbaye de Longchamp – (2) – Sharpo (1982), Double Schwartz (1986)
 Prix de l'Arc de Triomphe – (4) – Detroit (1980), Rainbow Quest (1985), Dancing Brave (1986), Trempolino (1987)
 Prix de Diane – (1) – Jolypha (1992)
 Prix de la Forêt – (3) – Brocade (1985), Wolfhound (1992), Indian Lodge (2000)
 Prix Ganay – (1) – Golden Snake (2001)
 Prix d'Ispahan – (1) – Sanglamore (1991)
 Prix Jacques Le Marois – (2) – The Wonder (1982), Lear Fan (1984)
 Prix Jean-Luc Lagardère – (1) – Tenby (1992)
 Prix Jean Prat – (1) – Olden Times (2001)
 Prix du Jockey Club – (3) – Caerleon (1983), Hours After (1988), Sanglamore (1990)
 Prix Lupin – (1) – No Lute (1981)
 Prix Maurice de Gheest – (3) – Beaudelaire (1983), Lead on Time (1986), Interval (1987)
 Prix Morny – (1) – Zafonic (1992)
 Prix du Moulin de Longchamp – (2) – Distant Relative (1990), All at Sea (1992)
 Prix de l'Opéra – (1) – Andromaque (1994)
 Prix Rothschild – (1) – Nashmeel (1987)
 Prix Royal-Oak – (3) – Old Country (1983), Raintrap (1993), Moonax (1994)
 Prix de la Salamandre – (1) – Zafonic (1992)
 Prix Vermeille – (2) – Bint Pasha (1987), Jolypha (1992)

 Germany
 Bayerisches Zuchtrennen – (1) – Kaieteur (2002)
 Grosser Preis von Baden – (1) – Glint of Gold (1982)

 Hong Kong
Jockeys' Invitation Race – Destiny (1974)
Hong Kong Derby – (2) – Breathing Exercise (1975),  Grand Duke (1977)
Queen's Silver Jubilee Challenge Cup – Caerdeon Line (1977)
St. Andrew's Plate – Seven Stars (1979)
Hong Kong Gold Cup – Observatory (1979)

 Ireland
 Irish 2,000 Guineas – (3) – Grundy (1975), Kings Lake (1981), Tirol (1990)
 Irish Champion Stakes – (2) – Kings Lake (1981), Sadler's Wells (1984)
 Irish Derby – (4) – Grundy (1975), El Gran Senor (1984), Law Society (1985), Commander in Chief (1993)
 Irish Oaks – (3) – Colorspin (1986), Wemyss Bight (1993), Bolas (1994)
 Irish St. Leger – (1) – Leading Counsel (1985)
 Matron Stakes – (1) – Mighty Fly (1983)
 Moyglare Stud Stakes – (1) – Woodstream (1981)
 National Stakes – (3) – El Gran Senor (1983), Law Society (1984), Danehill Dancer (1995)
 Phoenix Stakes – (3) – Achieved (1981), Digamist (1987), Danehill Dancer (1995)
 Tattersalls Gold Cup – (1) – Batshoof (1990)

 Italy
 Derby Italiano – (1) – Old Country (1982)
 Gran Premio del Jockey Club – (2) – Silver Patriarch (1998), Golden Snake (2000)
 Gran Premio di Milano – (1) – Tony Bin (1988)
 Premio Presidente della Repubblica – (1) – Tony Bin (1988)
 Premio Roma – (2) – Knifebox (1993), Taipan (1998)

 Japan
 Japan Cup – (1) – Jupiter Island (1986)

 Slovakia
 Slovenské Derby – (1) – Lonango (1997)

 United States
 Arlington Million – (1) – Tolomeo (1983)
 Breeders' Cup Sprint – (1) – Sheikh Albadou (1991)
 Breeders' Cup Turf – (1) – Pebbles (1985)
 Man o' War Stakes – (1) – Defensive Play (1990)

Major wins as a trainer
 Italy
 Gran Criterium – (1) – Hearts of Fire (2009)

References

1952 births
2015 deaths
Honorary Officers of the Order of the British Empire
People from Newbridge, County Kildare
Irish racehorse trainers
Irish jockeys
Lester Award winners
Sportspeople from County Kildare
British Champion flat jockeys
Place of death missing
British Champion apprentice jockeys